Uelzen is a district (Landkreis) in Lower Saxony, Germany. It is bounded by (from the south and clockwise) the districts of Gifhorn, Celle, Heidekreis, Lüneburg and Lüchow-Dannenberg, and by the state of Saxony-Anhalt (district of Altmarkkreis Salzwedel). The district capital is the town of Uelzen.

History
From the Middle Ages on the region was part of the duchy of Brunswick-Lüneburg and its successor states.

Geography
The district comprises the eastern part of the Lüneburg Heath (Lüneburger Heide). The Ilmenau river has its source in the district. From here it runs northwards to the town of Lüneburg. The countryside is flat and sparsely populated.

Coat of arms
The coat of arms displays:
 three crosses, symbolising the monasteries of Ebstorf, Oldenstadt and Medingen
 the heraldic lion from the arms of Brunswick-Lüneburg

Towns and municipalities

References

External links

 Official website 

 
Districts of Lower Saxony